Crossotus freoides is a species of beetle in the family Cerambycidae. It was described by Breuning in 1938.

References

freoides
Beetles described in 1938